Stanislav Bondarenko (born 29 August 1987 in Zaporizhzhia, Ukrainian SSR, Soviet Union) is a retired Ukrainian judoka. He competed at the 2012 Summer Olympics in the +100 kg event, losing to Matjaž Ceraj in the first round.

References

External links
 
 

1987 births
Living people
Ukrainian male judoka
Olympic judoka of Ukraine
Judoka at the 2012 Summer Olympics
Sportspeople from Zaporizhzhia
European Games competitors for Ukraine
Sambo practitioners at the 2019 European Games